Underpants are underwear worn on the lower body.
In British English they are often called simply pants.

Types of underpants

Long underpants

Long underpants are the bottom half of a style of two-piece underwear called long underwear, long johns, or thermal underwear, that has long legs and long sleeves that is normally worn during cold weather, and is commonly worn by people under their clothes in cold countries. The male version of a long underwear bottom may or may not have a front fly.

Boxer shorts

Boxer shorts, boxers, or trunks (Britain), have an elasticated waistband that is at or near the wearer's waist, while the leg sections are fairly loose and extend to the mid-thigh. There is usually a fly, either with or without buttons. The waistbands of boxers are usually wider than those of the various types of briefs, and often bear the brand name of the manufacturer.

Boxer briefs

Boxer briefs are similar in style to boxer shorts, but are form-fitting like briefs. Like briefs they often utilize a fly. 

Sometimes boxer briefs are called trunks (Britain), but see next section.

Midway briefs

Midway briefs are similar in style to boxer briefs, but are longer in the leg, at the longest being up to the knees.

Trunk briefs

Trunk briefs, also known as simply trunks, are shorter than boxer briefs but still have leg sections, unlike classic briefs.

Briefs

Classic briefs have an elasticated waistband at or near the wearer's waist, and leg bands that end at or near the groin. Many briefs feature a fly. They also come in ultra-absorbent varieties.

Bikini briefs 

                                                                                   
Bikini briefs are a variation on classic briefs that have less coverage; though typically full coverage of the derrière. Conventionally, they have no fly.

Thong

Thongs are like bikini briefs, except the backside is very narrow and goes between the buttocks.

Panties

"Panties" is a general term for female underpants. The UK English equivalent is "knickers".

Diapers

Diapers are a type of underwear worn by young children and those suffering from incontinence. Unlike other briefs, diapers allow the wearer to urinate or defecate without soiling their surroundings. These can be either reusable or disposable.

History

See also
Leggings

References

Undergarments